Provenance is a 2017 British drama film written and directed by Ben Hecking.  The movie stars Charlotte Vega, Christian McKay and Harry Macqueen.

Provenance had its world premiere at the East End Film Festival on 17 June 2017, scoring 10/10 for its first rating after the festival.

Synopsis
John Finch has fled to his holiday home in the south of France to start a new way of life. Whilst waiting for his younger lover Sophia to join him, a seemingly chance encounter with a man called Peter will threaten to destroy everything.

Cast
 Charlotte Vega as Sophia
 Christian McKay as John Finch
 Harry Macqueen as Peter
 Chereene Allen as Lara
 Luke Beattie as Agent
 Ludivine Parra as Marie

Reception

Accolades
Provenance won Best Film and Best Supporting Actor (Harry Macqueen) at the Madrid International Film Festival on 15 July 2017. Charlotte Vega was nominated Best Actress at the same festival.

References

External links
 

2017 films
2017 drama films
British drama films
Films set in France
2017 directorial debut films
2010s English-language films
2010s British films